Youth in Crisis is a 1943 American short documentary film produced by Louis de Rochemont as part of The March of Time series. It was nominated for an Academy Award for Best Documentary Short.

References

External links

1943 films
1943 short films
1943 documentary films
Black-and-white documentary films
1940s English-language films
American short documentary films
The March of Time films
20th Century Fox short films
American black-and-white films
1940s short documentary films
American social guidance and drug education films
1940s American films